Lady Enereta High School is an independent Cambridge International high school in Zimbabwe. It is located approximately 111 kilometers from the city of Harare along the Bindura/Mt. Darwin highway (A11) on the northern side of Bindura. Lady Enereta is a modern International high school offering full boarding facilities for both boys and girls from form 1 to form 6. The School opened its doors in January 2020 and in its first year of operation, it enrolled learners in form 1, 2, and lower 6 classes. The School is run by a Board of Directors and owned by a family trust. Until March 2020, David Mutambara, an educationist, was the Chairman of the Board of Directors of Lady Enereta High School before Lanny Diamond took over as the Chairman of the Board of Directors in April 2020. Mrs. Richardson is the current Principal of Lady Enereta International High School.

External links

Boarding schools in Zimbabwe
Education in Mashonaland Central Province